Mary Meigs Atwater (February 28, 1878 – September 5, 1956) was an American weaver.  She revived handweaving in America by collecting weaving drafts, teaching and writing; Handweaver and Craftsman called Atwater "the grand dame and grand mother of the revival of handweaving in [the United States]".

Atwater studied art at the Chicago Art Institute and in Paris, France. She lived in several western states, Bolivia and Mexico. When living in Basin, Montana, she began weaving as an artistic outlet and to provide business opportunities for the women in her community. She organized a weaving guild and published The Shuttle-Craft Book of American Hand-Weaving (Macmillan, 1928). She wrote monographs on specific weave structures as well as an instructional course in hand weaving (Cambridge, 1923). The artistic endeavor of handweaving nearly disappeared in America except for Weaver Rose (William Henry Harrison Rose) and his sister Elsie Maria Babcock Rose  in Rhode Island and isolated women in the Appalachian Mountains. Mary Meigs Atwater researched patterns and collected forgotten weaves and through her efforts restored weaving in America as an artistic endeavor. As she states in The Shuttle-Craft Book of American Hand-Weaving , "There are actually more hand-looms in operation at the present time than there were at the time of the Revolution when all textiles were woven by hand."

"The 20th-century revival of American hand-weaving began with a few individuals who rediscovered the old coverlets and the surviving weavers. These interested individuals saw a need to collect the woven pieces and knowledge still around before the coverlets were permanently destroyed and the information lost. They recorded or acquired coverlets and coverlet fragments, as well as written drafts, notebooks, and account books. Founding weaving schools and donating collections to museums, these individuals including Mary Meigs Atwater, left a legacy to today's weavers, historians and collectors."

See also 
 James E. Atwater (grandson)

References

Further reading

 

1878 births
1956 deaths
19th-century women textile artists
19th-century textile artists
American weavers
American expatriates in France
American expatriates in Mexico
American expatriates in Bolivia